is a railway station in the city of Nakano, Nagano Prefecture, Japan operated by East Japan Railway Company (JR East).

Lines
Kaesa Station is served by the Iiyama Line, and is 8.8 kilometers from the starting point of the line at Toyono Station.

Station layout
The station consists of one ground-level island platform serving two tracks, connected to the station building by a level crossing. The station is a  Kan'i itaku station.

Platforms

History
Kaesa Station opened on 20 October 1921. With the privatization of Japanese National Railways (JNR) on 1 April 1987, the station came under the control of JR East.

Passenger statistics
In fiscal 2015, the station was used by an average of 121 passengers daily (boarding passengers only).

Surrounding area
former Toyota village hall
Chikuma River

See also
 List of railway stations in Japan

References

External links

 JR East station information 

Railway stations in Nagano Prefecture
Iiyama Line
Railway stations in Japan opened in 1921
Nakano, Nagano